Indubala Sukhadia (2 July 1921 – 8 May 1999), wife of Mohanlal Sukhadia, was a social and political leader of Rajasthan. She was elected as Member of Parliament from Udaipur constituency in 1984. She died on May 8, 1999 at age 73
due to a cardiac arrest. She was cremated with full honours with a large number of people, including state Chief Minister Ashok Gehlot present.

References

Women in Rajasthan politics
1921 births
1999 deaths
India MPs 1984–1989
Lok Sabha members from Rajasthan
Indian National Congress politicians from Rajasthan
20th-century Indian women politicians
20th-century Indian politicians
Politicians from Udaipur
Social leaders